The 2013 ICC World Cricket League Africa Region Twenty20 Division One was an international Twenty20 cricket tournament that took place between 23 February–1 March 2013. It was the second edition of the ICC Africa Twenty20 Championship's Division One. Uganda hosted the event for the second time in a row, with all matches again played in the capital, Kampala.

Teams
Teams that qualified are as follows:

Squads

Fixtures

Group stage

Points table

Matches

Statistics

Most runs
The top five run scorers (total runs) are included in this table.

Most wickets
The top five wicket takers (total wickets) are listed in this table.

See also
2013 ICC World Twenty20 Qualifier
World Cricket League Africa Region

References

2014 ICC World Twenty20